Gheorghe Megelea (born 14 March 1954) is a retired Romanian javelin thrower who won a bronze medal at the 1976 Olympics. In 1977–78, he defected via Great Britain to Canada.

References 

1954 births
Romanian male javelin throwers
Olympic bronze medalists for Romania
Athletes (track and field) at the 1976 Summer Olympics
Olympic athletes of Romania
Romanian defectors
Living people
Medalists at the 1976 Summer Olympics
Olympic bronze medalists in athletics (track and field)
Universiade medalists in athletics (track and field)
Universiade gold medalists for Romania
Medalists at the 1975 Summer Universiade